This article is about the demographic features of the population of Saint John's, including population density, internet access, crime rate, and other aspects of the population.

Population 
According to the 2011 census the population of Saint John's was 24,451.

Other demographics statistics (2011)

Census Data (2011) 
Source:

Individual

Household 
There are 7,879 households in Saint John's.

See also 
Demographics of Antigua and Barbuda

References 

Antigua and Barbuda Christians
Demographics of Antigua and Barbuda
St. John's, Antigua and Barbuda